Kogilageri is a village in Dharwad district of Karnataka, India.

Demographics 
As of the 2011 Census of India there were 272 households in Kogilageri and a total population of 1,371 consisting of 690 males and 681 females. There were 184 children ages 0-6.

References

Villages in Dharwad district